Chinar Kharkar and Mahesh Ogale, popularly known as Chinar–Mahesh, are music composer duo who are popular for their work in Marathi film industry.

Career
Chinar Kharkar & Mahesh Ogale aka Chinar–Mahesh are college friends. Mahesh is interested in western music. He was a Guitar Performer in Rock band while Chinar learned music from Anil Mohile. Both were performing in College Festivals for long time. They started working together in the industry.

Chinar–Mahesh started their career as music composer with film Oti Krishnamaichi in 2004. They came into lime light with Marathi blockbuster movie Balak Palak and then Timepass, another blockbuster both directed by Ravi Jadhav. They composed music of Balak Palak along with Vishal–Shekhar.

Discography

 Composed music with other music directors

References

Sources
 
 
 Chinar Mahesh Rock Band
 Music should come from the heart
 Timepass Music Review
 Ravi Jadhav chooses Mahesh-Chinar over Vishal-Shekhar

External links
 
 Chinar-Mahesh Rock Band

Marathi cinema
Indian male composers